Stephen Hanley (born 29 May 1959) is an Irish-born English musician who grew up in and lives in Manchester, He is best known as the bass guitarist in the Fall from 1979 to 1998. His distinctive and muscular basslines were a signature part of their sound, often carrying the songs' instrumental melodies. Hanley is second only to Mark E. Smith in longevity in the band. With Peter Hook, Andy Rourke and Gary Mounfield, he is widely considered one of the pre-eminent Manchester bassists of his generation. He has always been very private and rarely interviewed; for this reason his 2014 autobiography The Big Midweek: Life Inside The Fall was highly anticipated. On publication it was met with widespread acclaim for its frank honesty and dry, no nonsense humour.

He is currently a member of Brix & the Extricated with guitarist and vocalist Brix Smith Start. He also plays bass with The House Of All, consisting of a number of other ex-Fall members, whose debut album was released in January 2023 to widespread acclaim.

Career

In 1978 he played in the Sirens alongside Marc Riley and Craig Scanlon. When Riley left to join the Fall, they became Staff 9, but disbanded when Hanley and Scanlon joined the Fall themselves in 1979. During the first half of the 1980s, Hanley's brother Paul was also a member of the Fall, playing drums and keyboards. In a late 80s interview, Smith said that "the most original aspect of The Fall is Steve...I've never heard a bass player like him. He is The Fall sound." Hanley co-wrote the music for over 100 Fall songs on more than a dozen albums; including the tracks "Rowche Rumble", "Fiery Jack", "Container Drivers", "Lie Dream of a Casino Soul", "Totally Wired", "Winter", "The N.W.R.A.", "To Nkroachment: Yarbles", "I Am Damo Suzuki", "Jerusalem", "Van Plague?", "Yes, O Yes", and "Free Range".

Hanley left the Fall in April 1998 following an onstage altercation in New York, which also resulted in the departures of longtime drummer Karl Burns and guitarist Tommy Crooks. Smith regretted the row and asked Hanley to return, but the bassist declined.

Following his departure from the Fall, he formed Ark with Burns, Crooks and former Creepers bassist Pete Keogh, the band releasing the album Brainsold in 2002, and joined the Lovers in 2001, a group fronted by Tom Hingley of Inspiral Carpets. Both these bands also featured Paul Hanley. The Lovers released two albums, Abba Are the Enemy, released in 2004, and Highlights which was released in March 2008. The band split amicably in 2012. He was briefly a member of fellow ex-Fall member Martin Bramah's group Factory Star, as was his brother Paul Hanley. "The Big Midweek" a book chronicling Hanley's time in the Fall, written by him with Olivia Piekarski, released by Route Publishing on 15 September 2014. He was also a member of Brix & The Extricated alongside brother Paul, Steve Trafford and Jason Brown.

His 2014 autobiography The Big Midweek: Life Inside the Fall was met with critical acclaim. As of 2023, Haney plays bass with The House Of All, a band consisting of his brother Paul, and other ex-Fall members Martin Bramah, Simon Wolstencroft, and Pete Greenaway. Their critically and fan acclaimed self-titled debut album is due for release in April 2023.

Discography

References

Sources
 Edge, Brian. Paintwork: Portrait of The Fall. London: Omnibus Press, 1989. 
 Ford, Simon. Hip Priest: The Story of Mark E.Smith and the Fall. London: Quartet Books, 2002. 
 Hanley, Steve. "The Big Midweek: Life Inside The Fall". London: Route, 2014. 
 Smith, Brix. The Rise, The Fall, and The Rise. London: Faber & Faber, 2017.

External links
 The Fall in Fives - Includes analysis of Hanley's songwriting and bass lines
 Van Plague? -  From "I Am Kurious Oranj"
 We are the Fall as if from Heaven, Reykjavik, 1981
 Totally Wired, New York 1981

1959 births
British people of Irish descent
English songwriters
Living people
Musicians from Manchester
English punk rock bass guitarists
The Fall (band) members